Jang Gyu-ri (born December 27, 1997) is a South Korean singer and actress. She finished ninth in Mnet's girl group survival show Idol School, becoming a member of the resulting girl group Fromis 9. Jang gained more recognition after starring in the television series It's Okay to Not Be Okay (2020). Jang left Fromis 9 and Pledis Entertainment after her contract with the company expired.

Early life
Jang Gyu-ri was born on December 27, 1997, in Seoul, South Korea. She attended Seoul Institute of the Arts, majoring in acting.

Career

Pre-debut
In 2017, Jang made a cameo in KBS drama Ms. Perfect before she became a trainee.

2017–2022: Idol School, Fromis 9, Produce 48 and acting debut

In 2017, Jang participated in the Mnet reality-survival program Idol School to form a new girl group. Jang placed 9th overall in the show's finale on September 29, becoming a member of Fromis 9. On November 29, Jang, together with Fromis 9, performed their pre-debut single titled "Glass Shoes" at the 2017 Mnet Asian Music Awards in Japan. Jang officially made her debut as a member of Fromis 9 with the EP To. Heart on January 24, 2018. 

On May 10, it was confirmed that Jang would be representing Stone Music Entertainment alongside Jo Yu-ri and 2 other contestants in Produce 48. She revealed that she had participated in the show in hopes of growing and further improving on herself. Jang was eventually eliminated after finishing in 25th place at the 3rd elimination round. She then returned to Fromis 9.

On May 10, 2019, Jang made her acting debut and starred in the web drama Dating Class as Kang Ji-young. She starred in the tvN television series It's Okay to Not Be Okay in 2020, where she gained more recognition.

2022–present: Departure from Fromis 9 and solo activities
On July 28, Pledis Entertainment announced that member Jang would be leaving Fromis 9 on July 31. Jang chose to maintain the conditions of the original contract with her former agency CJ E&M that would last only one year and not sign the new contract with Pledis Entertainment.

She starred in the SBS television series Cheer Up in the second half of 2022, making it her first project since leaving the group.

In August 2022, Jang signed with Just Entertainment.

Discography

Singles

Filmography

Television series

Web series

Television shows

Awards and nominations

Notes

References

External links

 
 

Living people
1997 births
Seoul Institute of the Arts alumni
21st-century South Korean women singers
21st-century South Korean singers
21st-century South Korean actresses
Musicians from Seoul
Produce 48 contestants
Hybe Corporation artists
South Korean female idols
South Korean television actresses
South Korean women pop singers
South Korean web series actresses
Pledis Entertainment artists